Home Sweet Home is a 1973 Belgian/French comedy film directed by Benoît Lamy, starring Claude Jade, Jacques Perrin, Marcel Josz, Ann Petersen, Jacques Lippe, Elise Mertens and Jane Meuris. It was entered into the 8th Moscow International Film Festival where it won a Diploma.

Plot
It all began on the day when a new boarder, Flore (Jane Meuris), arrived on the scene. Flore considers the home as a hotel. Jules (Marcel Josz), surprised by her comes to life. And disaster follows... The management steps in: Claire (Claude Jade), the nurse has a love-affair, Jacques (Jacques Perrin), the social worker, highly regarded by the old folks, is sacked. Now the town, which has a stake in the home, takes drastic measures: the chief of police (Jacques Lippe) assists the manager (Ann Petersen) with loving care. Home Sainte-Marguerite is running amok. It all happens in a flash: the mutiny, the fire on the fourth floor, the fire brigade, the panic.

The protagonists of this film are elderly people who live in an old folks home in Brussels where daily living is dictated by militarist rules and where they are treated with condescension, and are there even humiliated as disobedient children. Claire, a beautiful and hard nurse is a young woman under the influence of the director, who does not dare say what she thinks, and the rules applies.  Gradually, thanks to welfare Jacques, Claire realises, that old people the right have to live and independent to believe in that Home.

Cast
 Claude Jade as Mademoiselle Claire
 Jacques Perrin as Jacques, l'assistant social
 Ann Petersen as Yvonne, la directrice de la maison de retraite
 Marcel Josz as Jules Claes
 Jane Meuris as Flore
 Elise Mertens as Anna Van Grammelaer
 Jacques Lippe as Le commissaire de police
 Andrée Garnier as Cora
 Dynma Appelmans as Marguerite Van Der Plats
 Henriette Lambeau as Annette Poels
 Josée Gelman as Simone

References

External links
 
 
Picture: Jacques Perrin, Claude Jade: Home sweet Home

1973 films
1973 comedy films
Belgian comedy films
1970s French-language films
Films about old age
Films set in Brussels
Films shot in Brussels
Films directed by Benoît Lamy
French-language Belgian films